Kristine Rusten (6 July 1940 - 3 December 2003) was a Norwegian politician for the Labour Party.

Born in Lom, Rusten was elected to the Norwegian Parliament from Oppland in 1977, and was re-elected on one occasion.

At a local level, she was a member of the executive committee of Lom municipal council from 1971 to 1975. She chaired the local party chapter from 1976 to 1977.

Outside politics she worked as a shopkeeper.

References

1940 births
2003 deaths
People from Lom, Norway
Members of the Storting
Oppland politicians
Labour Party (Norway) politicians
Women members of the Storting
20th-century Norwegian women politicians
20th-century Norwegian politicians